is a passenger railway station in located in the city of Kainan, Wakayama Prefecture, Japan, operated by West Japan Railway Company (JR West).

Lines

Station layout
The station consists of two opposed side platforms connected to the station building by a footbridge. The station is unattended.

Platforms

Adjacent stations

|-
!colspan=5|West Japan Railway Company (JR West)

History
Shimotsu Station opened on August 20, 1924. With the privatization of the Japan National Railways (JNR) on April 1, 1987, the station came under the aegis of the West Japan Railway Company.

Passenger statistics
In fiscal 2019, the station was used by an average of 383 passengers daily (boarding passengers only).

Surrounding Area
 Kainan City Shimotsu Administration Bureau Shimotsu Branch Office
Kainan City Shimotsu Elementary School
 Kainan City Shimotsu Daiichi Junior High School

See also
List of railway stations in Japan

References

External links

 Shimotsu Station Official Site

Railway stations in Wakayama Prefecture
Railway stations in Japan opened in 1924
Kainan, Wakayama